Fujinami may refer to:
 Japanese destroyer Fujinami 
 Ryunosuke Fujinami, fictional character from the manga series Urusei Yatsura
 Shintaro Fujinami, Japanese baseball player
 Takahisa Fujinami, Japanese motorcycle rider
 Tatsumi Fujinami, Japanese professional wrestler
 Fujinami Station (disambiguation)

Japanese-language surnames